Tomelilla is a locality and the seat of Tomelilla Municipality in Skåne County, Sweden with 6,444 inhabitants in 2010.

Climate 
Tomelilla has an oceanic climate with very mild winters by Nordic standards due to its southerly latitude near the sea. The Bollerup station closed in 2021.

References 

Populated places in Tomelilla Municipality
Populated places in Skåne County
Municipal seats of Skåne County
Swedish municipal seats
15th-century establishments in Skåne County